Wels Hauptbahnhof, occasionally Wels Central Station or Wels central station is a railway station at Wels, which is the second largest city in the federal state of Upper Austria, in the north of Austria.

Opened in 1851, the station is owned and operated by the Austrian Federal Railways (ÖBB).  It forms part of the Western Railway, and is also a junction of the Wels–Passau railway, the Alm Valley railway, and the Aschach railway.

Location
Wels Hauptbahnhof is situated in the Bahnhofstraße, at the northwestern edge of the city centre.

History
On 1 April 1835, the Budweis–Linz–Gmunden horse-drawn railway was opened. Its route included Wels.  In addition to people, it transported salt from the Salzkammergut to Linz, or further to Bohemia.  The horse-drawn railway passed directly through the Wels city centre. However, as early as 1855 the horses were replaced by steam locomotives.  From that time, the line contracted to the section between Linz and Gmunden, because the horse-drawn railway's northern section was not suited to the locomotives.

In 1851, the Western Railway was opened from Vienna to Salzburg and Passau, and the Wels station building was moved.  The new station building was constructed in the Romantic style. It consisted of an elongated central section with corner pavilions at both ends. At that time, the station had only four tracks.

When the Passau railway was planned, it was decided that its terminus would be Wels instead of Linz. This decision made the Wels station a major railway hub. In 1860, the Passau line went into operation.

In 1886, the line to Aschach was opened; this line branched off the Passau line only in Haiding, but the trains continued to Wels. In 1893, the Alm Valley railway opened, and this line similarly terminated in Wels, before continuing via Sattledt to Rohr im Kremstal, where the Alm Valley railway and the Pyhrn railway met each other.   In 1901, the Alm Valley railway was extended to Grünau im Almtal. Due to the increase in traffic associated with the opening of these lines, Wels Hauptbahnhof had to be enlarged.

After World War I, there were already plans for improvement. The Deutsche Reichsbahn took over the expansion of Passau line, which was completed in the autumn of 1938. Not far from the station, a marshalling yard was opened. In 1937, the station was rebuilt.

During World War II, the station suffered heavy air attacks. In its reconstruction in 1945, the station missed out on the chance to take on a new look. The island platforms with pedestrian underpass were constructed only in 1959. Above the station, there had been a bridge linking Wels with the Neustadt district; in the same year it was replaced by an underpass.

In 1992 the Wels signal box was built. East of the station, a "Rolling highway" was opened, to transport trucks by train between Wels and Mainz. Now such trains run from Wels to many European cities. In 2003, the station was completely rebuilt within the framework of the ÖBB's Bahnhofsoffensive.  In 2005 this work was completed.

Station building
The station building is divided into three levels:
 In the first (ground) level are a post office, a flower shop and a café, a tobacconist, newspaper and book shop and two ticket machines.
 The second level (1st floor) houses a mobile phone shop, internet shop, a hairdresser, a bakery, a restaurant, a ticketing system and the ÖBB travel centre.
 In the third level (2nd floor), there are public toilets and access to the pedestrian bridge over the platforms.

Train services
The station is served by the following services:

Intercity Express services (ICE 91) Hamburg - Hanover - Kassel - Nürnberg - Passau - Linz - St Pölten - Vienna - Vienna Airport
Intercity Express services (ICE 91) Dortmund - Essen - Düsseldorf - Cologne - Koblenz - Frankfurt - Nürnberg - Passau - Linz - St Pölten - Vienna - Vienna Airport
RailJet services Zürich - Innsbruck - Salzburg - Linz - St Pölten - Vienna - Győr - Budapest
RailJet services Munich - Salzburg - Linz - St Pölten - Vienna - Győr - Budapest

Platforms
Wels Hauptbahnhof has seven through tracks (track 1, 2, 3, 4, 5, 6 and 8) and four bay platforms (tracks 7a, 7b, 11 and 12).

The bridge from the station building over the platforms also links the station with the Neustadt district on the other side of the tracks.  It has three entrances to each platform (elevator and two flights of stairs or escalators) except for platforms 1 and 11, 12.

Interchange
The station has a bus terminal served by Wels local buses and Postbuses.

See also 

History of rail transport in Austria
Rail transport in Austria

References

External links 

This article is based upon a translation of the German language version as at July 2011.

Railway stations in Upper Austria
Railway stations opened in 1851
Wels
1851 establishments in the Austrian Empire
Railway stations in Austria opened in the 19th century